The Enforcer is a ship design created by Royal Schelde (now Damen Schelde Naval Shipbuilding) following the design and building of HNLMS Rotterdam. HNLMS Rotterdam was jointly developed by the Royal Netherlands Navy and the Spanish Navy.

Development began in the 1980s, when the Royal Netherlands Navy began investigating ways to provide an amphibious transport capability. In 1994, preliminary design work began. The Spanish government proposed in 1990 to collaborate on the design. A Memorandum of Understanding was signed in June 1992. Development of the base design occurred during 1993, after which the navies turned to local companies for further design work and construction: Royal Schelde in the Netherlands, and Bazán (which became Navantia in 2005) in Spain.

Royal Schelde completed one ship to the Rotterdam class, with  constructed between 1995 and 1998. Bazan/Navantia completed two ships to the Galicia-class design.

After building Rotterdam, Royal Schelde developed the "Enforcer Family": four variants of the Enforcer design intended for export sale. Increased modularity, less powerful propulsion systems, and  allowed the company to offer the export variants at lower prices.

The design was used for the British Bay-class landing ships. Four vessels were built for the Royal Fleet Auxiliary by two shipyards between 2002 and 2007, with one sold in 2011 to the Royal Australian Navy.

The Enforcer design was considered a contender for the Indian Navy Multi-Role Support Vessel programme.

Ships based on Enforcer design
Here is a list of ships that are based on the Enforcer design.

References

Amphibious warfare vessels